Mahmood-ul Hassan (8 August 1924 – 18 February 1988) was a Pakistani field hockey player. He competed at the 1948 Summer Olympics and the 1952 Summer Olympics.

References

External links
 

1924 births
1988 deaths
Pakistani male field hockey players
Olympic field hockey players of Pakistan
Field hockey players at the 1948 Summer Olympics
Field hockey players at the 1952 Summer Olympics
Sportspeople from Sahiwal